606 may refer to:

606, the year.
The drug "606" or "compound 606", which became known as arsphenamine
Roland TR-606 Drum Machine
606 (radio show), the BBC Radio 5 Live phone-in and accompanying internet discussion forum
Bloomingdale Trail, or "the 606," an urban elevated trail in Chicago, converted from the Bloomingdale Line
Area code 606, in Kentucky
606 is a fake name that the band Foo Fighters sometimes go under for secret concerts

See also
 A-606 (disambiguation)